Ludovico di Breme (Turin, 1780 – Turin, 15 August 1820), whose complete name was Ludovico Arborio Gattinara dei Marchesi di Breme, was an Italian writer and thinker, as well as a contributor to Milan's principal romantic journal, Il Conciliatore.

His works include Intorno alla ingiustizia di alcuni giudizi letterari italiani (1816), Il Grand commentaire sur un petit article (1817), Il saggio sul Giaurro del Byron (1818), and Le Postille contro i Cenni critici sulla poesia romantica del Londonio, as well as a number of articles in Il Conciliatore.

References

Further reading 

 Biography of Ludovico di Breme by Wolfram Krömer, 1961 (in German)

1780 births
1820 deaths
People from Turin
People from the Kingdom of Sardinia
Italian male writers
Coppet group